Los secretos del buzón ( The mailbox secrets) is a 1948 Argentine comedy film, directed by Catrano Catrani and written by Ariel Cortazzo. It was premiered on April 22, 1948.

The film narrates the infidelity suspicions of an apothecary to his wife.

Cast
 Pedro Quartucci
 Tito Lusiardo
 Augusto Codecá
 Nelly Darén
 Elina Colomer
 Carlos Castro
 Benita Puértolas
 José Ruzzo
 Alberto Dalbes
 Nelly Meden
 Carlos Rivas
 Max Citelli

External links
 

1948 films
1940s Spanish-language films
Argentine black-and-white films
1948 comedy films
Argentine comedy films
1940s Argentine films